Sebastian Ziajka (born December 15, 1982) is a Polish former footballer.

Career

Club
He joined Podbeskidzie Bielsko-Biała in 2008. For the 2009–2010 season, he was loaned to Dolcan Ząbki on a one-year deal. He returned to Podbeskidzie in the summer of 2010.

Honours

Zawisza Bydgoszcz
 Polish SuperCup: 2014
 Polish Cup: 2013–14

References

External links
 

1982 births
Living people
People from Kostrzyn nad Odrą
Sportspeople from Lubusz Voivodeship
Polish footballers
Association football midfielders
Miedź Legnica players
Ząbkovia Ząbki players
Podbeskidzie Bielsko-Biała players
Zawisza Bydgoszcz players
Bruk-Bet Termalica Nieciecza players
1. FC Frankfurt players
Ekstraklasa players
Polish expatriate footballers
Expatriate footballers in Germany